The SAARC Baseball Championship is the main championship tournament between national baseball teams in South Asia. It is governed by the Baseball Federation of Asia (BFA). The first championship tournament began on 12 April 2011 and was hosted in Lahore, Pakistan. Four international teams from South Asia participated, including Nepal, Sri Lanka and Afghanistan.

Tournament results

Current members (alphabetically)

See also
Baseball awards#Asia
South Asian Games

References

External links 
 SAARC Games Olympics

Asia Baseball Cup, 2010
Asia Baseball Cup, 2010
International baseball competitions in Asia
Recurring sporting events established in 2011